The 1866 North Carolina gubernatorial election was held on October 18, 1866. Incumbent Democrat Jonathan Worth defeated National Union nominee Alfred Dockery with 75.87% of the vote.

General election

Candidates
Jonathan Worth, Democratic
Alfred Dockery, National Union

Results

References

1866
North Carolina